Dating Alternatib is the fifteenth studio album of the Filipino trio Apo Hiking Society. It's an 8-track album released in 1996 under Universal Records.

Track listing
Kayod, Kayod (3:11)
Kailan Mo Ako Pagbibigyan (3:18)
Adik Sa 'yo (4:42)
Dedmahan (Nakaw Na Sandali) (4:08)
Malungkot Na Balita (4:02)
Trapik Tralala (4:09)
Tanggapin Mo Kung Gusto Mo (3:01)
Paalam (2:47)

Related links
The Official Apo Hiking Society Website  

APO Hiking Society albums
1996 albums